Pamela J. Powers is an American government official who served as the Acting United States Deputy Secretary of Veterans Affairs from April 2, 2020, to January 20, 2021.

Education
Powers graduated from the United States Air Force Academy and received a Bachelor of Science degree in Organizational Psychology. She earned a Master of Strategic Studies from the United States Army War College and a Master of Organizational Management from the University of Phoenix.

VA investigation
Powers was a central figure in an Inspector General investigation  into allegations then-VA Secretary Robert Wilkie attempted to smear a Veteran who claimed to be sexually assaulted. 

Powers told investigators women veterans described walking through the medical center as a “gauntlet” of unwelcome interactions, such as “cat calls.” She later told investigators that conditions in the medical center improved, but did not say what improvements VA made.

In the interview with investigators, Powers stated that Wilkie, in relating a conversation he had with Congressman Dan Crenshaw, “might have said something to the fact that, (the veteran) made allegations in the military as well when (Congressman Crenshaw and the veteran) served together or something to that effect.”

The Inspector General requested a second interview with Powers, but she repeatedly refused. 

The Inspector General stated, “The evidence is replete with examples of VA senior leaders undertaking defensive actions and engaging in confrontational messaging while failing to recognize the need to take corrective action to address known problems.”

Personal life
Powers' great-grandfather served in World War I and her grandfather served in World War II. She served in the United States Air Force and retired as a colonel on March 1, 2018. Her awards and decorations include the Legion of Merit and the Defense Meritorious Service Medal.

References

Living people
Recipients of the Legion of Merit
Trump administration personnel
United States Air Force Academy alumni
United States Air Force officers
United States Army War College alumni
United States Deputy Secretaries of Veterans Affairs
University of Phoenix alumni
Year of birth missing (living people)